
Gmina Jejkowice is a rural gmina (administrative district) in Rybnik County, Silesian Voivodeship, in southern Poland.

It has the smallest area of any rural gmina in Poland.

Neighbouring gminas
Gmina Jejkowice is bordered by the towns of Rybnik and Rydułtowy, and by the gmina of Gaszowice.

Twin towns – sister cities

Gmina Jejkowice is twinned with:
 Služovice, Czech Republic

References

Jejkowice
Rybnik County